"Come Follow Me (To the Greenwood Tree) " is an English language nursery rhyme and a popular children's song. It can be an "ask a question" nursery song. Asking where shall thee follow.

Lyrics

The most common modern version is often sung as a round for four voice parts. A possible arrangement for SATB is as follows:
{| class="wikitable"
!Soprano
!Alto
!Tenor
!Bass
|-
|Come, follow, follow, follow, follow, follow, follow me,
|
|
|
|-
|Where shall I follow, follow, follow.
|Come, follow, follow, follow, follow, follow, follow me.
|
|
|-
|Where shall I follow, follow, thee.
|Where shall I follow, follow, follow, follow.
|Come follow, follow, follow, follow, follow, follow, me.
|
|-
|To the greenwood, to the redwood, to the redwood, redwood tree.
|Where shall I follow, follow, thee
|Where shall I follow, follow, follow.
|Come follow, follow, follow, follow, follow, follow, me.
|-
|
|To the greenwood, to the redwood, to the redwood, redwood tree..
|Where shall I follow, follow, thee.
|Where shall I follow, follow, follow.
|-
|
|
|To the greenwood, to the redwood, to the redwood, redwood tree.
|Where shall I follow, follow,
|-
|
|
|
|To the greenwood, to the redwood, to the redwood, redwood tree.
|} The text above is often sung multiple times in succession to allow for the different voices to interweave with each other, forming four-part harmony.

Pop Culture

The song was featured in an animated insert on Sesame Street, in which the three turtle kids teach their Uncle Edgar (the banjo playing turtle) about round singing).

References

American nursery rhymes
English children's songs
American folk songs
Songs about trees
Traditional children's songs
Rounds (music)
Year of song unknown
Songwriter unknown